Ahmetçe can refer to:

 Ahmetçe, Ayvacık
 Ahmetçe, İskilip